Chapter Four refers to a fourth chapter, but the term may also refer to:

Music
"Chapter Four", a song by Avenged Sevenfold from Waking the Fallen
Chapter 4, a band on J Records
Chapter 4 (EP), an EP by Zion I
Chapter Four: Alive in New York, an album by Gato Barbieri
Chapter 4: Labor Pains, an album by Syleena Johnson

Television
 "Chapter 4" (House of Cards), 2013
 "Chapter 4" (American Horror Story), 2016
 "Chapter 4: Sanctuary", a 2019 episode of the Mandalorian
 "Chapter Four: Dear Billy", a 2022 episode of Stranger Things

Aviation
 Chapter 4 standard of the ICAO Annex 16, Volume 1 Aircraft noise regulation